The Brattleboro Free Folk Festival is an American annual music festival which takes place in Brattleboro, Vermont. The festival began in 2003 and is considered part of the New Weird America music movement.

References

Further reading
 

Brattleboro, Vermont
Folk festivals in the United States
Tourist attractions in Windham County, Vermont
Festivals established in 2003
2003 establishments in Vermont